Deqing County, formerly romanized as Takhing, is a county in western Guangdong province, China, under the administration of the prefecture-level city of Zhaoqing.


History
Under the Qing, Deqing County made up part of the commandery of Zhaoqing.

Administrative divisions

Defunct: Shapang Town & Guyou Town

Sights

Climate

Notes

References

Citations

Bibliography
 , reprinted 2000.

Zhaoqing
County-level divisions of Guangdong